{{DISPLAYTITLE:Pi1 Octantis}}

Pi1 Octantis (Pi1 Oct), Latinized π1 Octantis, is a solitary star in the southern circumpolar constellation Octans. It is faintly visible to the naked eye with an apparent magnitude 5.64, and is estimated to be 387 light years away.

Pi1 Oct has a stellar classification of G8/K0 III — intermediate between a G8 and K0 giant star. However, an enlarged radius of  yields a luminosity 76 times that of the Sun.

References

Octans
K-type giants
G-type giants
130650
073540
5525
PD-82 629
Octantis, 21